Scopula puerca is a moth of the  family Geometridae. It is found in Ecuador.

References

Moths described in 1901
puerca
Moths of South America